Khasanbi is a given name. Notable people with the name include:

Khasanbi Bidzhiyev (born 1966), Russian footballer
Khasanbi Taov (born 1977), Russian judoka

See also
Khasan (disambiguation)